David Lewis (born 1942), a French-born English neuropsychologist, is founder and director at the independent research consultancy Mindlab International based at the Sussex Innovation Centre in Brighton. Additionally, he is a chartered psychologist, an author and lecturer. He currently specialises in non-invasive techniques for measuring human responses under real life conditions. The studies started in the early 1980s while he was a doctoral student at the University of Sussex and required him to develop both the hardware and software necessary to monitor and record electrical activity in the brain.

He has a first-class honours degree in psychology and biology from the University of Westminster and a doctorate from the Department of Experimental Psychology at the University of Sussex, where he lectured in clinical psychology and psychopathology before setting up his own research organisation.

He is the author of books covering a range of psychological topics, a lecturer and Sony award-winning broadcaster for a BBC Radio 5 Live series on the psychological relationships between sports stars and their mentors and trainers.

In the early 1990s his work was featured on BBC TV's Tomorrow's World.

Bibliography 
 The Secret Language of Your Child. How Children Talk Before they Can Speak, 1978. .
 Thinking Better, (with James Greene) 1982. 
 Know Your Own Mind, (with James Green) 1983. .
 Fight Your Phobia and Win, 1984 .
 Loving and Loathing, 1985 .
 The Alpha Plan, 1986. .
 Mind Skills. Giving Your Child a Brighter Future, 1987. .
 Helping Your Anxious Child, 1988. .
 The Secret Language of Success. Using Body Language to Get What You Want, 1989. .
 Heart Attack, 1990 
 Help Your Child Through School, 1992. 
 Information Overload. Practical Strategies for Surviving in Today's Workplace, 1999
 The Soul of the New Consumer: Authenticity What We Buy and Why in the New Economy, (with Darren Bridger) 2000 
 The Man who invented Hitler, 2003. . New Ed edition (November 1, 2004), Publisher: Headline Book Publishing; . 
 Pass That Exam, (DVD) 2002
 Mastering Your Memory, (DVD) 2007
 Impulse: Why We Do What We Do Without Knowing It, 2013.

References

External links 
 Dr David Lewis - his business homepage.

Living people
Neuropsychologists
French psychologists
Alumni of the University of Westminster
Alumni of the University of Sussex
1942 births